In the Book of Genesis, the mountains of Ararat (Biblical Hebrew , Tiberian ,) is the term used to designate the region in which Noah's Ark comes to rest after the Great Flood. It corresponds to the ancient Assyrian term Urartu, an exonym for the Armenian Kingdom of Van.

Since the Middle Ages the "mountains of Ararat" began to be identified with a mountain in present Turkey (historical Armenia) known as Masis or Ağrı Dağı; the mountain became known as Mount Ararat.

History 
Citing historians Berossus, Hieronymus the Egyptian, Mnaseas, and Nicolaus of Damascus, Josephus writes in his Antiquities of the Jews that "[t]he ark rested on the top of a certain mountain in Armenia, . . . over Minyas, called Baris."

Likewise, in the Latin Vulgate, Jerome translates Genesis 8:4 to read: "requievitque arca . . . super montes Armeniae" ("and the ark rested . . . on the mountains of Armenia"); though in the Nova Vulgata as promulgated after the Second Vatican Council, the toponym is amended to "montes Ararat" ("mountains of Ararat").

By contrast, early Syrian and Eastern tradition placed the ark on Mount Judi in what is today Şırnak Province, Southeastern Anatolia Region, an association that had faded by the Middle Ages and is now mostly confined to Quranic tradition.

The Book of Jubilees specifies that the ark came to rest on the peak of Lubar, a mountain of Ararat.

Sir Walter Raleigh devotes several chapters of his Historie of the World (1614) to an argument that in ancient times the mountains of Ararat were understood to include not only those of Armenia, but also all of the taller mountain ranges extending into Asia. He maintains that since Armenia is not actually located east of Shinar, the ark must have landed somewhere in the Orient.

See also
 Armenian highlands
 Mount Ararat
 Mount Tendürek
 Durupınar site
 Searches for Noah's Ark
 River system of Mesopotamia
 Euphrates
 Tigris
 Taurus / Zagros Mountains
 Mount Judi

Notes

References

Further reading
 Murat, Friedrich (1901). Ararat und Masis: Studien zur armenischen Altertumskunde und Litteratur. Heidelberg: Carl Winter's Universitätsbuchhandlung.
 Raleigh, Walter Sir (1614). The Historie of the World. London: Printed by William Stansby for Walter Burre, and are to be sold at his shop in Paules Church-yard at the signe of the Crane.

Ararat
Noah's Ark
Ararat
Mount Ararat
Book of Jubilees